Must We Get Divorced? is a 1953 West German comedy film directed by Hans Schweikart and starring Hardy Krüger, Ruth Leuwerik and Tilda Thamar.

It was made at the Bavaria Studios in Munich. The film's sets were designed by the art director Fritz Lück and Hans Sohnle. Location filming took place in Lucerne and at the Nürburgring.

Plot
After a Formula One driver suffers an accident, he goes to Switzerland to recover where he falls in love with an Argentine millionaire. On returning to Germany he tells his wife, and they soon appear to be heading toward a divorce.

Cast
Hardy Krüger as Andreas von Doerr
Ruth Leuwerik as Garda von Doerr
Tilda Thamar as Joan de Portago
Hans Söhnker as Dr. Algys
Fita Benkhoff as Elisabeth Lindpaintner
Gustav Knuth as Dr. Spitzkoetter
Karl Schönböck as Prosecutor Paul
Paul Bildt as Professor
Peer Schmidt as Theobald
Inge Konradi as Bettina
Charlotte Witthauer as Frl. Müller
Günther Lüders as Karlchen, Mixer
Therese Giehse as Frau Holzer
Rudolf Vogel as Herr Huber
Walter Janssen as Hotelportier im 'Savoy'
Dieter Borsche

See also
All Lies (1938)

References

External links

1953 comedy films
German comedy films
West German films
Films directed by Hans Schweikart
Remakes of German films
German black-and-white films
1950s German films
Films shot at Bavaria Studios
1950s German-language films